Union Sportive Sbeitla also known as USS , is a Tunisian football club, based in the city of Sbeitla in Tunisia. The club was founded in 1947. The team plays in red and white and plays its home matches at the Stade of Sbeitla, which has a seating capacity of 2500 spectators.

The team is currently playing in the Tunisian Third Football League. It was nominated for the first time in its history for the golden square of the Tunisian Cup on June 9, 2013, with JS Kairouan, CA Bizertin and Avenir Sportive de la Marsa , which are teams playing in the first Tunisian Professional Football League.

References

External links
US-Sbeitla in Soccerway

Football clubs in Tunisia
Association football clubs established in 1947
1947 establishments in Tunisia
Sports clubs in Tunisia